BCO may refer to:

 Baco Airport, an airport in Ethiopia.
 BioCompute Object, a type of computational file built using the BioCompute standard for communicating workflows in high throughput sequencing analysis.
 Baseball Confederation of Oceania, the governing body for baseball in Oceania.
 Binary-coded octal, binary-encoded octal code
 Biodiversity Convention Office, a Canadian government office on biodiversity.
 Cash Offer, an all-cash non-contingent real estate offer.
 Boulder, Colorado